Tomostima is a genus of flowering plants belonging to the family Brassicaceae.

Its native range is Northern America, Peru to Southern South America.

Species:
 Tomostima araboides (Wedd.) Al-Shehbaz, M.Koch & Jordon-Thaden 
 Tomostima australis (R.Br. ex Hook.f.) Al-Shehbaz, M.Koch & Jordon-Thaden

References

Brassicaceae
Brassicaceae genera